Protein FAM40A is a protein that is located on chromosome 1 in humans and is encoded by the FAM40A gene.

Characteristics and secondary structure
FAM40A has an isoelectric point of 5.92 and a molecular weight of 95,575 daltons.  It is predicted to have three transmembrane domains, making it a transmembrane protein. FAM40A does not contain a signal peptide and is also predicted to bind to DNA, possibly making it a membrane protein in the nuclear membrane.

The secondary structure of FAM40A is predicted to contain twenty-six alpha helices and two beta sheets. The 5' untranslated region of FAM40A is predicted to contain one stem-loop and the 3' untranslated region is predicted to contain eight stem-loop structures. Two miRNAs are predicted to bind to two of the stem-loop structures present in the 3' UTR region.

Homology
FAM40A has no paralogs. However, it does have orthologs stretching all the way back to yeast. It has been suggested that FAM40A is a homolog to the yeast gene FAR11, which is involved in the recovery from cell cycle arrest.

The following table represents a small selection of orthologs found using searches in BLAST and BLAT.  This is by no means a comprehensive list, however it does show the vast diversity of species where FAM40A orthologs are found.

Expression
FAM40A is expressed in high levels during the blastocyst, eight-cell stage, and fetal stages of development. FAM40A has also been shown to be expressed in high levels in the mammary glands, brain, thymus, mouth and the testes. It has also been shown to be expressed in high levels in mammary gland tumors, leukemia cells, and germ cell tumors.

Transcription Regulation
FAM40A is predicted to have a promoter region 789 base pairs upstream of the start of transcription. The SOX transcription factors are predicted to bind to the promoter region of the FAM40A gene, possibly indicating a role in sex determination.

Interactions
FAM40A has been shown to interact with RP6-213H19.1, STRN, PDCD10, TRAF3IP3, STRN3, PPP2R1A, MOBKL3, CTTNBP2NL, STK24 and PPP2CA.

References

Further reading